Bengt Eriksson (22 January 1931 – 19 November 2014) was a Swedish nordic combined skier. He won an individual silver medal at the 1956 Winter Olympics and finished 10th at the 1960 Games. Between 1953 and 1966 he won eight national titles. He also competed nationally in association football and internationally in ski jumping, finishing 19th in the normal hill at the 1960 Olympics. In 1965 he was awarded the Holmenkollen medal, shared with Arto Tiainen and Arne Larsen.

References

External links
 
  – click Holmenkollmedaljen for downloadable pdf file 
 Bengt Eriksson at sok.se

1931 births
2014 deaths
People from Malung-Sälen Municipality
Nordic combined skiers at the 1956 Winter Olympics
Nordic combined skiers at the 1960 Winter Olympics
Ski jumpers at the 1956 Winter Olympics
Holmenkollen medalists
Swedish male Nordic combined skiers
Swedish male ski jumpers
Olympic Nordic combined skiers of Sweden
Olympic ski jumpers of Sweden
Olympic medalists in Nordic combined
Olympic silver medalists for Sweden
Medalists at the 1956 Winter Olympics
Sportspeople from Dalarna County